The Taj Mahal Travellers (also given variously as Taj Mahal Travelers, Taj-Mahal Travellers, etc.) were a Japanese experimental music ensemble founded in 1969 by former Group Ongaku leader and Fluxus member Takehisa Kosugi. The rest of the group were several years younger than Kosugi, and were all inspired by the spirit of the day. They chose mainly to perform their music outdoors, often on beaches and hilltops, creating spontaneously improvised drones (compare with Dronology), often using standard musical instruments, albeit in unconventional ways (e.g., a bowed double bass placed flat on its back). The group's sound was heavily reliant on electronic processing, particularly delay effects.

Personnel
 Takehisa Kosugi: electric violin, harmonica, voice etc.
 Ryo Koike: electric double bass, santur, voice, etc.
 Yukio Tsuchiya: tuba, percussion, etc.
 Seiji Nagai: trumpet, Mini-Korg synthesizer, tympani, etc.
 Michihiro Kimura: voice, percussion, mandolin, etc.
 Tokio Hasegawa: voice, percussion, etc.
 Kinji Hayashi: electronic technique

Discography
 Live Stockholm July 1971
 First issue (unauthorized): Double CD, Drone Syndicate DS-01/02, 2001
 Second issue (authorized): Double CD, Super Fuji Discs FJSP-51/52, 2008
 July 15, 1972
 album, CBS Japan SOCM-95, 1972
 Re-issue: CD, Showboat SWAX-501, 2002
 Oz Days Live Compilation also featuring Les Rallizes Denudes and Acid Seven Group (Taj Mahal Travellers has one track only)
 Double LP, with Les Rallizes Dénudés, 1973
 August 1974
 Double LP, CBS Japan OP-7147-8-N, 1975
 Re-issue: Double CD, P-Vine PCD-1463/4, 1998

External links
 
 Discography/Biography at SoundOhm
 Tour documentary at Ubu.com

Japanese rock music groups
Japanese experimental musical groups
Musical groups established in 1969